Abd Mutalip bin Abd Rahim is a Malaysian politician. He is the Member of Johor State Legislative Assembly for Layang-Layang from 14 May 2013 to 12 May 2018 and since 12 March 2022. He was also the Johor State Executive Councillor for Religion from 14 May 2013 to 12 May 2018.

Election Results

References 

Living people
People from Johor
Malaysian people of Malay descent
 United Malays National Organisation politicians
21st-century Malaysian politicians
Year of birth missing (living people)
Members of the Johor State Legislative Assembly
Johor state executive councillors